Sanjukta Mukti Fouj (SMF) (Assamese: সংযুক্ত মুক্তি ফৌজ) is the military wing of the banned outfit ULFA in Assam, India. It was formed on March 16, 1996 and it has three full-fledged battalions – the 7th, 28th and 709th with allocated spheres of operation in HQ- Sukhni, Tinsukia/Dibrugarh and Kalikhota respectively. The rest of the battalions are said to exist only on papers.

Battalions
This is a list of the battalions along with their allocated operation-spheres.

Ceasefire of 28th Battalion
On June 24, 2008, the A and C company of ULFA's 28th battalion offered unilateral ceasefire and renamed themselves as “ULFA (Pro-Talk)”. This battalion is considered as the backbone of the outfit.

See also
ULFA
SULFA
 Bhomita Talukdar

References

External links
Indian army

Politics of Assam
Paramilitary organisations based in India
Organisations based in Assam
Assamese nationalism
Terrorism in Assam
1996 establishments in Assam
Organisations designated as terrorist by India